Joshua Jake Goodall  (born 17 October 1985) is a retired English tennis player, former British no 2 and Davis Cup player. He is currently Director of Tennis.

Personal life 
Goodall attended Cranbourne School, now called Cranbourne Business and Enterprise College.
His parents remortgaged their house five times to support his tennis career.

Career
On 23 June 2007 Goodall reached his only ATP (World) Tour final, in doubles, at the Nottingham Open. He and partner Ross Hutchins lost that match in three sets 6–4, 3–6, [5–10] to Eric Butorac and Jamie Murray.

Goodall was British no 2, behind Andy Murray from 13 August 2012 with a world ranking of 196, until 19 November 2012.

Goodall played Davis Cup twice, in the 2009 Europe/Africa Zone Group I first round against Ukraine and the 2012 Europe/Africa Zone Group I second round against Belgium. At the Belgium tie, Goodall was the British no 1, in the absence of Andy Murray.

ATP career finals

Doubles: 1 (1 runner-up)

ITF Futures tournament wins

Singles: 20

Grand Slam performance timelines

Singles

Doubles

References

External links
 
 
 
 Goodall World Ranking History

English male tennis players
Living people
Sportspeople from Basingstoke
1985 births
Tennis players at the 2010 Commonwealth Games
British male tennis players
Tennis people from Hampshire
Commonwealth Games competitors for England